The Kitoy Goltsy is a mountain range in Siberia, Russia, part of the Eastern Sayan Mountains.

Rivers: Kitoy River and other tributaries of the Angara River.

See also
List of mountains and hills of Russia
Golets (geography)

References

Sayan Mountains